The 1946 Nebraska Cornhuskers football team was an American football team that represented the University of Nebraska as a member of the Big Six Conference during the 1946 college football season. In their first year under head coach Bernie Masterson, the Cornhuskers compiled a 3–6 record (3–2 against Big 6 opponents) and were outscored by a total of 161 to 126.

Six Nebraska players received honors from the Associated Press (AP) or United Press (UP) on the 1946 All-Big Six Conference football team: back Thoma Novak (AP-1, UP-2); back Dick Hutton (AP-2, UP-1); back Sam Vacanti (AP-2, UP-2); tackle Carl Samuelson (AP-2, UP-2); guard Ed Schwartzkopf (AP-2, UP-3); and center Joe Partington (UP-3).

The team played its home games at Memorial Stadium in Lincoln, Nebraska.

Before the season
After the unexpected departure of head coach George Clark after just one year, Nebraska athletic director and former head coach Adolph J. Lewandowski hired Bernie Masterson, considered well-learned in running the T formation offense popular at the time.  Masterson retained only one of Clark's assistant coaches, yet brought back former Nebraska head football coach Glenn Presnell as an assistant with his new staff.  After the remarkable turnaround of Nebraska's fortunes in 1945, the Cornhuskers looked to continue their climb up from the depths of the war years.

Schedule

Roster

 Bunker, Willard
 Cochrane, Alex
 Collopy, Frank
 Deviney, Robert
 DiBiase, Michael
 Fischer, Cletus
 Gade, Gail
 Hall, Gordon
 Hazen, Jack
 Hopp, Wallace
 Hutton, Richard
 Jacupke, Gerald
 Leik, Francis
 Lipps, Robert
 Long, Roy
 Lorenz, Fred
 Mandula, Francis
 McWilliams, James
 Metheny, Fred
 Moomey, William
 Moore, Gerald
 Myers, James
 Novak, Tom
 Nyden, Ed
 Partington, Joe
 Pesek, Jack
 Rooney, Patrick
 Samuelson, Carl
 Schleiger, Robert
 Schwartzkopf, Ed
 Sedlacek, John
 Stiner, Vernon
 Stroud, Harvey
 Taylor, James
 Tegt, Robert
 Thompson, Richard
 Thomson, James
 Vacanti, Sam
 Wilkins, Frank

Coaching staff

Game summaries

Minnesota

It was another in a long string of disappointing losses as Nebraska once again was overmatched and outplayed by longtime nemesis Minnesota in Minneapolis.  The Cornhuskers managed a single touchdown to avoid the shutout, but found that implementing coach Masterson's schemes would be a work in progress.  It was the sixth win in a row in the series for the Golden Gophers, as they extended their mastery over Nebraska to 22-4-2.

Kansas State

Every player on the Nebraska roster saw playing time as the Cornhuskers easily bounced the Wildcats in the Lincoln home opener.  Kansas State never found the scoreboard while also failing to prevent Nebraska from putting points up in all four quarters.  It was Nebraska's fourth straight win over the Wildcats as they improved to 25-4-2 all time.

Iowa

Iowa brought the Cornhuskers to Iowa City for Nebraska's second non-conference game of the year, and dealt a blow to the Cornhuskers with the help of repeated Nebraska miscues.  Although Iowa allowed the first points of the game to be scored by Nebraska, the rest of the day belonged to the Hawkeyes.  The Cornhuskers could have made it a game, but fumbles and stalled drives were too much to overcome, and their series lead slipped to 24-11-3.

Kansas

In front of a Kansas homecoming crowd in Lawrence, the Cornhuskers played a back and forth game against the Jayhawks, but once holding the lead, kept their advantage to the end and locked in their 40th all-time decision over the disappointed home team.  A late fourth-quarter touchdown allowed Kansas to narrow the final margin, but could not prevent the Cornhuskers from securing their second series win in a row and improving to 40-10-3 all time.

Indiana

Reigning Big 9 champion Indiana arrived in Lincoln to provide Nebraska's second major challenge of the season.  By halftime the Cornhuskers had not yet scored and lagged by 14 points, but halved the gap shortly after the break.  The Hoosiers were not seriously threatened by the lone Nebraska score as they subsequently rolled off another thirteen points to pull away and improve to 6-3-2 over the Cornhuskers, their sixth straight win in the series.  Indiana went on to finish the season 6-3 and ranked 20th by the AP Poll,

Missouri

Missouri was the target for the 1946 Nebraska homecoming fray, and an impressive contest was held by both squads as they battled up and down the field.  Missouri initially succeeded while the Cornhuskers struggled to create progress, but with just seconds left in the first half Missouri allowed a score that denied them the first half shutout.  The conversion kick after went wide, and the one missed point would ultimately decide the game.  Nebraska was driving late with under five minutes to go but finally went three and out, and the Tigers then ran the clock out to escape with the one point win.  Nebraska's hold on the series overall remained strong at 24-13-3.

Iowa State

The Cyclones were dominated by an effective attack by ground and air at Memorial Stadium, and also by several of their own miscues.  With points scored in all four quarters by the Cornhuskers, Iowa State simply fell before the onslaught and never overcame the momentum to avoid a shutout defeat.  Nebraska's ownership of the series advanced to 31-8-1.

Oklahoma

For the first time in five years, Nebraska had a chance at the Big 6 championship, as both squads entered their last Big 6 game with 3-1 league records.  Oklahoma, however, was highly favored, and ranked #18 upon the arrival of the Cornhuskers in Norman.  At first, the Cornhuskers made it a game, keeping up with the Sooners at 6-7, but Oklahoma quickly shut down all further Nebraska efforts and ran away with the game to hand Nebraska their 30th Big 6 league loss of all time.  Oklahoma clinched the Big 6 title, went on to finish the season 7-3 overall, and earned a final #14 ranking from the AP Poll.

UCLA

This was the first time Nebraska had met UCLA on the field, and the Bruins marked the event by handing down the first shutout loss of the season to the Cornhusker squad.  Nebraska made several key defensive plays to slow UCLA's offensive machine, but it was impossible to turn away all attacks and the undefeated Bruins eventually put in eighteen points on the day.  UCLA finished 1946 at 10-0, ranked #4, and participated in the 1947 Rose Bowl, losing the decision 45-14 to Illinois.

After the season
Coach Masterson's first season did not measure up to expectations, though some of the disappointments could be attributed to the installation of yet another new coach's schemes, as Masterson was the fifth head coach at Nebraska in just the past ten years.  The brief ray of hope for a resurgence under previous coach Clark's one year in 1945 seemed dimmer, but there was still reason to hope.  Masterson's first year team moved Nebraska backwards overall, to 312-133-31 (.688), but improved the league record slightly to 116-30-11 (.774).

NFL Draft

The 1947 NFL Draft was held on December 16, 1946. The following Cornhusker was selected.

References

Nebraska
Nebraska Cornhuskers football seasons
Nebraska Cornhuskers football